Third-seeded Emily Hood and Mall Molesworth defeated the second seeds Marjorie Cox and Sylvia Harper 6–3, 0–6, 7–5 in the final, to win the women's doubles tennis title at the 1930 Australian Championships.

Seeds

  Daphne Akhurst /  Louie Bickerton (semifinals)
  Marjorie Cox /  Sylvia Harper (final)
  Emily Hood /  Mall Molesworth (champions)
  Kathleen Le Messurier /  Dorothy Weston (semifinals)

Draw

Draw

References

External links
  Source for seedings

1930 in Australian tennis
1930 in women's tennis
1930 in Australian women's sport
Women's Doubles